Mątki  is a village in the administrative district of Gmina Ryjewo, within Kwidzyn County, Pomeranian Voivodeship, in northern Poland.

Before 1772 the area was part of Kingdom of Poland, 1772-1945 Prussia and Germany. In 1945 it returned to Poland. For the history of the region, see History of Pomerania.

References

Villages in Kwidzyn County